Sim Woo-yeon (born 3 April 1985) is a South Korean football player who plays for FC Seoul. His preferred position is as a centre-back, however, he can also operate as a forward.

Club career statistics

External links
 
 Sim Woo-yeon – National Team stats at KFA 
 

1985 births
Living people
Konkuk University alumni
Footballers from Seoul
South Korean footballers
South Korea under-20 international footballers
South Korea under-23 international footballers
South Korea international footballers
Association football defenders
Association football forwards
FC Seoul players
Jeonbuk Hyundai Motors players
Seongnam FC players
K League 1 players